Shredy Jabarin (other orthographies: Shredi Jabarin) is a Palestinian actor. Born on the 2nd of Dec 1981 in Jaffa, he studied acting at the faculty of art in the theatre department and the film department in Tel Aviv University from 1999 to 2003. He participated in international films and theatre plays in English, French, German, Arabic and Hebrew. Shredy has one nomination for best actor for his role in the film For my Father. He played main parts in films like For my Father and The Saviour where he played Jesus.

In addition to being an actor, Shredy wrote, directed and produced short films, music videos and theatre plays.

Actor
Nominations
 Nominated to the Israeli Film Academy Award  for the Best Actor Category For my father, 2008.
 Nominated to the Israeli Theatre Award representing the Cameri theater, 2008.
Film
 2015  The Children of light waiting for Giddo - Shredy Jabarin
 2014  Mars at Sunrise - Jessica Habie
 2013  Played the character of Jesus in the film “The Savior” - Robert Savo
 2013  Kiddon - Emanuel Nekach
 2010  Miral - Julian Schnabel
 2009  Mrs. Moskowitz&the Cats - George Gorevitz
 2009  Carmel - Amos Gitai 
 2008  Body of Lies - Ridley Scott 
 2008  For my Father - Dror Zahavi
 2006  The Bubble - Eytan Fox
 2005  Avenge but One of My Eyes - Avi Mograbi
 2005  Free Zone - Amos Guitai
Theater
 2011-2012 The Day before the last Day - Schaubuehne, Berlin, Germany
 2010-2012 Death and the Maiden - directed by Juliano Mer Khamis Al Midan Theatre, Haifa, Israel
 2009-2010 The Wars of Sons of Light  - directed by Amos Guiai, with Jeanne Moreau and Éric Elmosnino in the  Festival d'Avignon and the Odeon Theatre, Paris, France
 2008-2010 The second End of Europe, directed by Janusz Wiśniewski - The Nowy Theatre, Poznan, Poland
 2008-2008 Gefen Baladi - The Cameri Theatre, Tel Aviv, Israel
 2006-2008 Plonter - The Cameri Theatre, Tel Aviv, Israel
 2005-2005 The Red Tent - The Simta Theatre, Tel Aviv, Israel
 2004-2004 Masked - The Arab Hebrew Theatre, Tel Aviv, Israel
 2004-2004 A winter in the Checkpoint directed by Nola Chilton - The Arab Hebrew Theatre, Tel Aviv, Israel
 2003-2004 Forced Landing - The Arab Hebrew Theatre, Tel Aviv, Israel
TV
 2013  The Jerusalem Syndrome - Dror Zahavi, ARD
 2012   - Dror Zahavi, ZDF
 2010-2011  Taxi Driver - Eythan Haner, Ethan Zur
 2010  Arabs Labor - Shay Capon
 2009  Naked Truth - Uri Barbash
 2008-2008 Good Intentions -  Uri Barabash

Director, writer, producer
 Wrote, directed and produced the short films 
 The Children of light waiting for Giddo - 2015
 Disconnections - 2015
 I am that - 2014
 MissBerlin - 2013
 Wrote, directed and produced music videos  
 Crying dogs - 2014
 Kali - 2013
 Wrote and directed the theatre play 
 MissFire - 2010

Articles and sources

 Personal website
 
 In 'For My Father,' A Bridge-Building Too Far?
 From the New York Times
 For my father
 A review from the new NYT about The Bubble

1981 births
Israeli filmmakers
Living people